Explorer Samuel de Champlain arrived on the ship Don de Dieu, or "Gift of God" to found Quebec in 1608.

Don de Dieu is one of three ships that set sail from France under Captain Henry Couillard  in the spring of 1608 to Tadoussac, from where the men, bringing the materials, reached on small boats what is now the Vieux-Québec (Canada), on July 3, 1608, date of the founding of Quebec City.

The ship is remembered in the motto of Quebec City: Don de Dieu feray valoir, "I shall put God's gift to good use."

1633 voyage to Quebec
In 1633, Cardinal Richelieu appointed Champlain as his lieutenant, giving him the opportunity to return to Quebec. (Champlain had been removed from his position as Governor of Quebec the prior year and had dedicated himself to working on a new edition of his voyages.) In March 1633, Champlain set sail for Quebec with about 200 colonists in three ships, Don de Dieu, St. Pierre, and St. Jean. He was received in Quebec with "loud acclamations."

Replica ship at 300th anniversary

A pageant was held for the 300th anniversary, the Quebec Tercentenary in 1908.
July 23. At 3 p.m. — Arrival of Champlain on his ship, Don de Dieu. At 4 o'clock. — Presentation of the Civic Address of welcome to H.R.H. The Prince of Wales with other official ceremonies commemorative of Champlain and of the founding of Quebec. Review of the Historical procession in front of the Champlain Monument. Illumination of the combined fleets and of the surrounding country in the evening and great display of fireworks on the Heights of Levis opposite Quebec.

References

External links
Arrival of the Don de Dieu, photograph and article from the Quebec Tercentenary Commemorative History
Description of the Don de Dieu, with drawing of the model at the Quebec Tercentenary

Ship names
Ships of France
History of Quebec City
Water transport in Quebec
Samuel de Champlain
1600s ships
Age of Discovery ships
Age of Sail individual ships